The black-tipped halfbeak, Hyporhamphus neglectissimus, is a halfbeak from the family Hemiramphidae.

Information
It is found in the Indo-West Pacific, where it replaces Hyporhamphus neglectus in waters around New Guinea and northern Australia. The Black-tipped halfbeak is known to be found within a marine environment within a pelagic-neritic range. This species is native to a tropical climate. The maximum recorded length of the Hyporhamphus neglectissimus as an unsexed male is about 14.4 centimeters or about 5.66 inches long. This species is native to the waters around New Guinea and northern Australia. The biology of this species explains this species to be a coastal species.

Classification
The taxonomic classification of the Hyporhamphus neglectissimus is as follows:
Kingdom : Animalia
Eumetazoa : metazoans
Phylum : Chordata
Subphylum : Vertebrata
Superclass : Gnathostomata
Euteleostomi : bony vertebrates
Actinopterygii : ray-finned fishes
Order : Beloniformes
Family : Hemiramphidae
Genus : Hyporhamphus
Species : Hyporhamphus neglectissimus

References

Black-tipped garfish
Fish described in 1980